The Club Deportivo Nuevo Chimalhuacán, commonly known as Nuevo Chimalhuacán, is a Mexican football club based in Chimalhuacán. The club was founded in 2011, and currently plays in the Serie B of Liga Premier.

Players

Current squad

References

External links 
 LigaMX page
 Soccerway page

Association football clubs established in 2011
Football clubs in the State of Mexico
2011 establishments in Mexico
Liga Premier de México